Hate is the third studio album by Brazilian extreme metal band Sarcófago, released in March 1994 through Cogumelo Records. It has a more stripped-down approach than their previous record, The Laws of Scourge (1991).

Hate is also notable for its controversial use of a drum machine. At the time Sarcófago were attempting to become the fastest band in the world, and there were no drummers in their native Brazil who could play at the required speeds. Frontman Wagner Lamounier claimed to have no qualms about using this device, on the basis that most death metal drummers use trigger pads for recording purposes, which in the end produces the same homogenized sound as that of a drum machine.

Track listing

"Satanic Terrorism" is about the "Inner Circle" church burnings in Norway that occurred during the early 1990s. Sarcófago was briefly accused of supporting these acts, but Lamounier has insisted that this is untrue.

Personnel
 Wagner Lamounier - lead vocals, guitar
 Gerald Minelli - backing vocals, bass
 Eugênio "Dead Zone" - keyboards, drum programming

Additional personnel
Taken from liner notes.
Marcos Machado: Backing Vocals on tracks 1, 4 and 5
"Andreia": Backing Vocals on track 6
Eduardo Paulista: Lead Guitar on track 6
Tarson Senra: Backing Vocals on track 10

References

Further reading

 Franzin, Ricardo (1997). Sarcófago: A "Pior" Banda do Mundo Fala Tudo. Rock Brigade, 130, 16-18.
 Gimenez, Karen (1995). Sarcófago: Quarteto que Virou Dupla. Rock Brigade, 102, 54-55.
 Nemitz, Cézar (1994). Sarcófago: O Tormento Continua... Dynamite, 13, 58-59.
 Ricardo, Gabriel (2008). Sarcófago: Tributo à Banda Mais Polêmica do Brasil. Roadie Crew, 114, 54-56.

1994 albums
Sarcófago albums